En Vivo Desde El Lunario is a live album by Peruvian singer-songwriter Gian Marco released by Caracola Records in 2009. It was the first live album of his career.

Release and reception
The album was a recorded at the Lunario National Auditorium during Gian Marco's concert on January 29, 2009. The album was nominated for Best Long Form Music Video at the Latin Grammy Awards 2009.

Track listing
All credits adapted from AllMusic.

Charts

Accolades
10th Latin Grammy Awards

|-
|2009
|style="text-align:center;"|En Vivo Desde El Lunario 
|style="text-align:center;"|Best Long Form Music Video
|
|-

References

Gian Marco live albums
2009 live albums
Spanish-language live albums